Le Vigan or Vigan may refer to:

Places in France
 Le Vigan, Gard, in the Gard department
 Le Vigan, Lot, in the Lot department
 Saint-Étienne-du-Vigan, previously called Vigan-d'Allier, in the Haute-Loire department

People
 Robert Le Vigan (1900-1972), French actor